Shahrak-e Sindar (also Romanized as Shahrak-e Sīndar; also known as Sīnīdar, Sīnandar, Sīndar, and Sinīdar) is a village in Afin Rural District, Zohan District, Zirkuh County, South Khorasan Province, Iran. At the 2006 census, its population was 425, in 97 families.

References 

Populated places in Zirkuh County